Karl Hermann Amandus Schwarz (25 January 1843 – 30 November 1921) was a German mathematician, known for his work in complex analysis.

Life
Schwarz was born in Hermsdorf, Silesia (now Jerzmanowa, Poland). In 1868 he married Marie Kummer, who was the daughter to the mathematician Ernst Eduard Kummer and  Ottilie née Mendelssohn (a daughter of Nathan Mendelssohn's and granddaughter of Moses Mendelssohn). Schwarz and Kummer  had six children, including his daughter Emily Schwarz.

Schwarz originally studied chemistry in Berlin but Ernst Eduard Kummer and  Karl Theodor Wilhelm Weierstrass persuaded him to change to mathematics.  He received his Ph.D. from the Universität Berlin in 1864 and was advised by Kummer and Weierstrass. Between 1867 and 1869 he worked at the University of Halle, then at the Swiss Federal Polytechnic. From 1875 he worked at Göttingen University, dealing with the subjects of complex analysis, differential geometry and the calculus of variations. He died in Berlin.

Work
Schwarz's works include Bestimmung einer speziellen Minimalfläche, which was crowned by the Berlin Academy in 1867 and printed in 1871, and Gesammelte mathematische Abhandlungen (1890).

Among other things, Schwarz improved the proof of the Riemann mapping theorem, developed a special case of the Cauchy–Schwarz inequality, and gave a proof that the ball has less surface area than any other body of equal volume. His work on the latter allowed Émile Picard to show solutions of differential equations exist (the Picard–Lindelöf theorem).

In 1892 he became a member of the Berlin Academy of Science and a professor at the University of Berlin, where his students included Lipót Fejér, Paul Koebe and Ernst Zermelo. In total, he advised at least 22 Ph. D students. In 1914 Schwarz's friends and former students published a volume with 34 articles in celebration of the 50th anniversary of his doctoral dissertation.

His name is attached to many ideas in mathematics, including the following:

Abstract additive Schwarz method
Additive Schwarz method
Schwarz alternating method

Schwarzian derivative
Schwarz function
Schwarz lantern
Schwarz lemma
Schwarz's list
Schwarz minimal surface
Schwarz theorem (also known as Clairaut's theorem)
Schwarz integral formula
Schwarz–Christoffel mapping
Schwarz–Ahlfors–Pick theorem
Schwarz reflection principle
Schwarz triangle
Schwarz triangle function
 Cauchy–Schwarz inequality
Theorem of Pohlke and Schwarz

Publications

Notes

External links 

 
 

1843 births
1921 deaths
20th-century German mathematicians
19th-century German mathematicians
Academic staff of ETH Zurich
Academic staff of the University of Göttingen
Academic staff of the Martin Luther University of Halle-Wittenberg
Academic staff of the Humboldt University of Berlin
Corresponding members of the Saint Petersburg Academy of Sciences
People from the Province of Silesia
People from Głogów County
Members of the Royal Society of Sciences in Uppsala